Hacker Dojo is a  community center and hackerspace that is based in Mountain View, California. Predominantly an open working space for software projects, the Dojo hosts a range of events from technology classes to biology, computer hardware, and manufacturing and is open to all types of hackers.

Organization 
The Dojo is run mostly democratically by its membership under the oversight of five elected directors.  Anybody can become a member, and hardship, worktrade and family rates are available.  Member votes rarely deal with specific instances, and more work with general policy on how the Dojo should run.  The Dojo is primarily financed through membership dues ($125/mo), but has historically accepted 3rd party sponsorships from Microsoft, Google, isocket, Twilio, AMS Dataserfs, and Palantir Technologies to fund expansions and renovations.

Culture 
The Dojo is entirely communal space from the tools in the electronics lab to the desks. Anything left there is considered fair game for anybody to play with.  Very few restrictions are placed upon people provided they do not detract from the experience of members or consume resources they do not replace. Any member may run an event, and event organizers are permitted to charge non-members for attendance to their event.  Members are always permitted to go everywhere they wish, provided they do not consume somebody else's finite resources (such as an event's food).

Physical Space 

The Hacker Dojo was originally located at 140 South Whisman Road in Mountain View, CA. The facility started as being only 140A  but the space expanded to include 140B in October 2009, and further expanded in October 2011 to lease units C and D, thus taking over the entirety of 140 S. Whisman. The expansion party was attended by several hundred individuals, including Steven Levy.

Because of zoning violations, the City of Mountain View blocked the use of units C and D, and restricted the use of units A and B to events no larger than 49 occupants., 140A was formerly an industrial artistic glassworking facility, though the community has put the space through a significant series of renovations.

In order to raise money to help meet building code requirements, the Dojo staged an "underwear run," on Saint Patrick's Day as a fund raiser.

Construction bids to bring the 140 South Whisman space up to building code requirements came in much higher than expected, and on Monday, October 15, 2012, the Dojo signed a lease to rent a building at 599 Fairchild Drive, also in Mountain View. Move-in occurred on February 13, 2013, and a ribbon-cutting ceremony was held on February 27, 2013 

The lease on the building at 599 Fairchild Drive ran through May 31, 2016, at which time the Dojo moved to its third home, located at 3350 Thomas Road in Santa Clara.

Hacker Dojo and its fourth iteration returns back to its founding city in 2022 at 855 Maude Avenue.

Controversies

Distributed denial of service attack
Members at Hacker Dojo could not access the Internet during several outages occurring between June 22 and July 14, 2013.  The problem was eventually traced to an amplified distributed denial-of-service attack (DDoS) attack.  In this case, the perpetrator was sending forged Domain Name Service (DNS) requests to multiple domain name servers, causing the servers to send large amounts data records to the Hacker Dojo, thereby overloading the system and preventing legitimate use of the network.

Dojo managers made several attempts to stop the attacks, but were unsuccessful. Eventually, they requested help from the Federal Bureau of Investigation (FBI), which determined the outages were the result of a criminal act by Jason David Miller, a former Dojo member.

According to the indictment, Miller had become a member on May 19, 2013, using the first name "ad" and the last name "min," such that his username became "ad.min" and his email address "ad.min@hackerdojo.com."   Dojo management forbids misleading usernames, and terminated his email account.  On June 1, 2013, Miller re-registered as "Dallas Smith," and began attacking the Dojo's internet service a few weeks later, starting on June 22, 2013.  He is charged with violation of Title 18 U.S.C. §§ 1030(a)(5)(A) and (c)(4)(B)(i)—Intentionally Causing Damage to a Protected Computer.  Miller was indicted in May 2014.

Miller claims he only intended to engage in a harmless prank.  He had been a teaching assistant, researcher, and Eagle Scout.  He was scheduled to be sentenced on October 3, 2016, in the courtroom of Judge Edward J. Davila in San Jose.

Embezzlement
In March, 2016, a local newspaper published an article saying the Dojo was facing a leadership crisis and that an employee had been accused of embezzlement.
Since 2016, The organization has had a major overhaul in leadership with new Board Members bringing back some of the Founding Team of Super Happy Dev House. The organization currently holds a Platinum badge of Transparency with Guidestar. https://www.guidestar.org/profile/26-4812213

Uses 
The three primary uses of Hacker Dojo are for events, as a coworking space, and for social purposes.

Events 
The 140B building has been turned into a place where events such as Random Hacks of Kindness, Startup Weekend, and BayThreat among others have been hosted.  It also has invented and run its own events such as a reverse job fair call the Hacker Fair where candidates present booths of their previous independent or open source work to company engineers who are accompanied by technical recruiters  and the Startup Fair, where young companies have booths for investors to consider. Members can hold events at the Dojo free of charge, subject to approval from the Dojo events committee.

Coworking 
A large number of Silicon Valley startups work daily out of the Hacker Dojo as their primary location, and Founders Institute, which is located nearby, encourages its members to work out of the Dojo

Notable Startups With Hacker Dojo History 
 Pinterest—the two founders met and built the first iteration of the product at Hacker Dojo
 Word Lens—acquired by Google
 Pebble Watches
 Infometers.com—acquired by Validic.com
 Skydera
 NetworkedBlogs
 Game Closure
 Chivaz Socks
 MicroMobs, now Wedding Party
 Cirroscope (then CirroSecure), acquired by Palo Alto Networks

Social 
The Dojo does movie nights, a weekly Happy Hour, and Friday Night Socials.

Dojo in 2022

Original Dojo

References

External links 

 "The official Hacker Dojo Google Group"
 "Peninsula hackers find a place to collaborate in Mountain View". Mercury News.  August 28, 2009
 "Hacker Dojo in Mountain View sparks ideas and tinkering". Mercury News.  October 16, 2009
 "A case for Hacker Dojo". 248Creative.com. February 2010.
 "Techies Get to Work at Hacker Dojo" Wall Street Journal. 3/9/2011.
 "At Hacker Dojo, Silicon Valley techies build toward success". CNet News.com. April 4, 2011.
 "The Stanford Igniters meetup once a month at Hacker Dojo"

Hacker groups
Computer clubs
Hackerspaces
Hackerspaces in the San Francisco Bay Area
Buildings and structures in Santa Clara, California
Culture in the San Francisco Bay Area
2009 establishments in California